Rostam Castle, Nain - also referred to as Haozdar Fort - is a castle in the Hamun County, and is one of the attractions of Sistan and Baluchestan Province. This castle was built by the Safavid dynasty-Seljuq dynasty.

Gallery

Sources 

Castles in Iran
Hamun County
Seljuk castles